is a Japanese diver who competed in the 1936 Summer Olympics. In 1936 he finished fourth in the 3 metre springboard event and sixth in the 10 metre platform competition.

References

External links
 

1917 births
Possibly living people
Japanese male divers
Olympic divers of Japan
Divers at the 1936 Summer Olympics